Mehran Ghassemi (April 8, 1977 – January 9, 2008) was an Iranian journalist. He was an expert on Iranian Nuclear Dossier and Foreign Policy and published hundreds of articles in Iranian newspapers.

Early years 
Ghassemi was working as the Editor of International Affairs Desk of Etemad-e Melli, a pro-reform daily named after a party established by the former reformist speaker of parliament, Mehdi Karrubi.

He was a critic of the conservative policies of the government led by Mahmoud Ahmadinejad.

During the 2005 Iranian presidential election, Ghassemi was the editor-in-chief of Aftab News, a news website which promoted Akbar Hashemi Rafsanjani and criticized his rivals.

Death 
He died January 9, 2008, at home in Tehran, at age 30, from heart failure and was laid to rest in Tehran cemetery (Behesht-e Zahra) in the “journalists” section (Ghet'ey-e Ashaab-e-Rasaaneh).

Books 
 Kimiâ Xâtoun, Sâles publication
 Felestin, na solh, na sâzesh

References

External links 
 Ghassemi's Blog
 On Ghassemi's death by Ata'ollah Mohajerani

1977 births
2008 deaths
Iranian journalists
Iranian bloggers
Iranian translators
People from Shiraz
20th-century translators
20th-century journalists